Pyrocephalus is a genus of bird in the tyrant flycatcher family, Tyrannidae.

The genus was introduced by the English ornithologist and bird artist John Gould in 1839 in Charles Darwin's Zoology of the Voyage of H.M.S. Beagle. The type species was designated as the scarlet flycatcher (Pyrocephalus rubinus) by the English zoologist George Robert Gray in 1840. The name Pyrocephalus combines the Ancient Greek purrhos meaning "flame-coloured" or "red" and -kephalos meaning "-headed".

Taxonomy
The tyrant flycatcher family, the Tyrannidae, is a group of passerine birds present only in the New World, and its members are generally drab in coloration. Within it, the subfamily Fluvicolinae comprises the genera Pyrocephalus, Contopus, Empidonax, and Sayornis. They likely shared a common ancestor in the Contopus or Xenotriccus genus before diversifying. The Pyrocephalus are most closely related to the Sayornis in terms of morphology, but genetic analysis shows that they may be more closely related to the Fluvicola. The vermilion flycatcher likely evolved around 1.15–million years ago (mya), with the species on the Galápagos Islands having split off around 0.82–mya. The South American species/subspecies diverged about 0.56–mya.

Species
The genus contains four species:

Notes

References

External links
 
 

 
Bird genera